Sir Clyde Leopold Walcott KA, GCM, OBE (17 January 1926 – 26 August 2006) was a West Indian cricketer.  Walcott was a member of the "three W's", the other two being Everton Weekes and Frank Worrell: all were very successful batsmen from Barbados, born within a short distance of each other in Bridgetown, Barbados in a period of 18 months from August 1924 to January 1926; all made their Test cricket debut against England in 1948. 
In the mid-1950s, Walcott was arguably the best batsman in the world. In later life, he had an active career as a cricket administrator, and was the first non-English and non-white chairman of the International Cricket Council.

Early and private life

Walcott was born in New Orleans (Bridgetown), St. Michael, Barbados.  His father was a printing engineer with the Barbados Advocate newspaper. He was educated at Combermere School and, from the age of 14, at Harrison College in Barbados. He took up wicket-keeping at Harrison College and also learned to bowl inswingers.

He married Muriel Ashby in 1951. They had two sons together. His brother, Keith Walcott, and a son, Michael Walcott, both played first-class cricket for Barbados.

Cricketing career

Walcott first played first-class cricket for Barbados in 1942, as a 16-year-old schoolboy. He made his first impression in February 1946, when, on a matting wicket, he scored 314 not out for Barbados against Trinidad as part of an unbroken stand of 574 for the fourth wicket with schoolfriend Frank Worrell (255 not out), setting a world record for any partnership in first-class cricket that remains a record in the West Indies.

He played his first Test in January 1948, the drawn 1st Test against England at Bridgetown.  Powerfully built, weighing 15 stone and 6"2' tall, he was an accomplished strokeplayer. From a crouched stance, he was particularly strong off the back foot, and quick to cut, drive or pull. Despite his height, Walcott also kept wicket for his country in his first 15 Tests, his versatility enabling to retain his position in the side despite some poor batting performances in his first few matches. By the time a back injury forced him to relinquish the gloves, his batting had improved sufficiently to enable him to keep his place. He became a good slip fielder, and was an occasional fast-medium bowler.

In 1950, his unbeaten 168 in the second innings of the 2nd Test at Lord's helped the team to its first Test victory, and ultimately first series win in England, assisted by the spin bowling of Sonny Ramadhin and Alf Valentine. He scored a century in both innings of two Tests in the series against Australia in 1955, when he became the first batsman to score five centuries in a single Test series, totalling 827 runs from 10 innings. He was dismissed for a duck only once in Tests, lbw to Ray Lindwall in the 1st Test against Australia at Brisbane in 1951.

He played for Enfield in the Lancashire League from 1951 to 1954, and moved to Georgetown in Guyana (then British Guiana) in 1954, to be the cricket coach for the British Guiana Sugar Producers' Association. He also played first-class cricket for British Guiana, and by 1956 he was captaining the side.  In retirement, he returned to Barbados in 1970.

He was a Wisden Cricketer of the Year in 1958.

Retirement

Walcott retired from playing Test cricket in 1960.  His early retirement from international cricket was attributed by many to his dissatisfaction with West Indian cricket politics relating to the captaincy, but he himself attributed it to disputes over pay.  He retired from first-class cricket in 1964.  He was awarded the OBE in 1966 for services to cricket in Barbados, Guyana and the West Indies.

In retirement, he had an active career as a cricket administrator.  He managed and coached various cricket teams, and was later a cricket commentator in Barbados.  He was President of the Guyana Cricket Board of Control from 1968 to 1970, and then a vice-president of the Barbados Cricket Association.  He was chairman of the West Indies selectors from 1973 to 1988, and managed the West Indies teams that won the Cricket World Cup in 1975 and 1979, and also in 1987.   He was president of the West Indies Cricket Board from 1988 to 1993. He was awarded the Barbados Gold Crown of Merit in 1991, and became a Knight of St Andrew in the Order of Barbados in 1993.

He ended his career at the ICC.  He was an International Cricket Council match referee in three matches in 1992, and became chairman of the International Cricket Council from 1993, the first non-English person and the first black man to hold the position.  He was knighted for services to cricket in 1994.  Both of the other two "Ws" were also knighted, Weekes in 1995 and Worrell in 1964, only three years before his early death.  He became the ICC Cricket Chairman in 1997, in charge of the ICC Code of Conduct, and oversaw investigations into allegations of match fixing.  He retired in 2000.

When Arsenal footballer Theo Walcott was first selected for the England football team in 2006, there were rumors that Sir Clyde was his great uncle.  In an article in The Sunday Telegraph, Sir Clyde said "he's definitely not a relative".

He published two autobiographies, Island Cricketers in 1958 and Sixty Years on the Back Foot in 1999. After Walcott's death, Michael Holding, the former West Indian fast bowler who made his debut when Walcott was manager, said: "Another good man gone – he is not only a West Indies legend but a legend of the world."

Notes

References

Obituary, Cricinfo, 27 August 2006
Obituary, BBC News, 26 August 2006
Obituary, The Daily Telegraph, 28 August 2006
Obituary, The Times, 28 August 2006
Obituary, The Guardian, 28 August 2006
Obituary, The Independent, 28 August 2006
 Windies mourn Test great Walcott, BBC News, 26 August 2006
Official Release from Barbados Cricket Association, BCA Website, 26 August 2006
Sir Clyde Walcott  Tribute

External links

West Indies Test cricketers
Barbadian cricketers
Barbadian knights
Officers of the Order of the British Empire
West Indian cricketers of 1945–46 to 1969–70
Barbados cricketers
Guyanese cricketers
Commonwealth XI cricketers
Cricket players and officials awarded knighthoods
Wisden Cricketers of the Year
Wisden Leading Cricketers in the World
1926 births
2006 deaths
Barbadian cricket administrators
Cricket match referees
People educated at Harrison College (Barbados)
People from Saint Michael, Barbados
Presidents of the International Cricket Council
West Indies cricket team selectors
Knights and Dames of St Andrew (Barbados)
Wicket-keepers
16 year old Clyde Leopoldo Walcott first played cricket for Barbados